The 2016 Africa Futsal Cup of Nations qualification was a men's futsal competition which decided the participating teams of the 2016 Africa Futsal Cup of Nations.

A total of eight teams qualified to play in the final tournament, including South Africa who qualified automatically as hosts, and Egypt who qualified automatically as the highest-placed African team in the 2012 FIFA Futsal World Cup.

Teams
A total of 12 teams entered the qualifying rounds.

Format
Qualification ties were played on a home-and-away two-legged basis. If the aggregate score was tied after the second leg, the away goals rule would be applied, and if still level, the penalty shoot-out would be used to determine the winner (no extra time would be played).

The six winners of the preliminary round qualified for the final tournament.

Schedule
The schedule of the qualifying rounds was as follows.

Preliminary round
Winners qualified for 2016 Africa Futsal Cup of Nations.

|}

Notes

Angola won 12–4 on aggregate.

Tunisia won on walkover.

7–7 on aggregate. Zambia won on away goals.

Morocco won 12–2 on aggregate.

Mozambique won 17–4 on aggregate.

Libya won 14–4 on aggregate.

Qualified teams
The following eight teams qualified for the final tournament.

1 Bold indicates champion for that year. Italic indicates host for that year.

Goalscorers

References

External links
2016 Africa Futsal Cup of Nations Media Guide (contains information about qualifiers)

2016 qualification
Caf qualification
2015 in futsal
Futsal qualification